Frank Hübner (born 16 October 1950) is a German sailor and Olympic champion. He won a gold medal in the 470 Class with Harro Bode at the 1976 Summer Olympics in Montreal He was also a producer for the 2002 Film Whale Rider.

References

External links
 
 
 

1950 births
Living people
German male sailors (sport)
Sailors at the 1976 Summer Olympics – 470
Olympic sailors of West Germany
Olympic gold medalists for West Germany
Olympic medalists in sailing
Medalists at the 1976 Summer Olympics